Leonardo Cazé dos Santos Neto (born 2 June 1996) is a Brazilian male  BMX rider, representing his nation at international competitions. He competed in the time trial event at the 2015 UCI BMX World Championships.

References

External links
 
 

 
1996 births
Living people
BMX riders
Brazilian male cyclists
Brazilian BMX riders
Place of birth missing (living people)